Arabellata is a genus of South Pacific sac spiders first described by V. Versteirt, L. Baert & Rudy Jocqué in 2010.  it contains only two species, both found in Papua New Guinea.

References

Araneomorphae genera
Clubionidae
Spiders of Asia